John Orien Crow (September 7, 1912 – June 21, 1994), sometimes referred to as Oren Crowe, was an American football center who played professionally in the National Football League (NFL) for the Boston Redskins from 1933 to 1934. A Cherokee, he attended the Haskell Institute—now known as Haskell Indian Nations University—where he played college football. Crow worked for the Bureau of Indian Affairs for many years, starting in 1933 as a clerical worker in North Dakota, and rising to become acting Commissioner in 1961, the first Native American to serve as commissioner since Ely S. Parker in 1871.

References

External links
 

1912 births
1994 deaths
American football centers
Boston Redskins players
Haskell Indian Nations Fighting Indians football players
United States Bureau of Indian Affairs personnel
People from Commerce, Oklahoma
People from Salem, Missouri
Players of American football from Oklahoma
Cherokee Nation sportspeople
Native American players of American football
20th-century Native Americans